Foros Spur (‘Rid Foros’ \'rid 'fo-ros\) is the 7.5 km long and 5.7 km wide rocky ridge forming the southeast extremity of Gromshin Heights on the east side of northern Sentinel Range in Ellsworth Mountains, Antarctica.  It surmounts Rutford Ice Stream to the east and lower Vicha Glacier to the west.

The feature is named after Foros Point on the Bulgarian Black Sea Coast.

Location
US mapping in 1961.

Maps
 Newcomer Glacier.  Scale 1:250 000 topographic map.  Reston, Virginia: US Geological Survey, 1961.
 Antarctic Digital Database (ADD). Scale 1:250000 topographic map of Antarctica. Scientific Committee on Antarctic Research (SCAR). Since 1993, regularly updated.

Notes

References
 Foros Spur. SCAR Composite Gazetteer of Antarctica.
 Bulgarian Antarctic Gazetteer. Antarctic Place-names Commission. (details in Bulgarian, basic data in English)

External links
 Foros Spur. Adjusted Copernix satellite image

Ellsworth Mountains
Bulgaria and the Antarctic
Ridges of Ellsworth Land